The men's artistic individual all-around event was part of the gymnastics programme at the 1924 Summer Olympics. It was one of nine gymnastics events and it was contested for the sixth time. The competition was held from Thursday, 17 July 1924, to Wednesday, 23 July 1924. Seventy-two gymnasts from nine nations competed. Each nation could send up to 8 gymnasts, up from 6 in previous Games. For the first time since 1904, the scores for individual competitors were used to calculate a team score (the team events were completely separate from 1908 to 1920). The men's artistic individual all-around was won by Leon Štukelj of Yugoslavia. Czechoslovakia's Robert Pražák took silver, while Bedřich Šupčík earned bronze. Both nations were making their debut in the event.

Background

This was the sixth appearance of the men's individual all-around. The first individual all-around competition had been held in 1900, after the 1896 competitions featured only individual apparatus events. A men's individual all-around has been held every Games since 1900.

Four of the top 10 gymnasts from the 1920 Games returned: gold medalist Giorgio Zampori of Italy, bronze medalist Jean Gounot of France, seventh-place finisher Luigi Maiocco of Italy, and tenth-place finisher Frank Kriz of the United States. Neither of the 1922 World co-champions competed in Paris, but third-place finisher Stane Derganc of Yugoslavia did.

Czechoslovakia and Yugoslavia each made their debut in the event. France and Italy each made their fifth appearance, tied for most among nations, both having missed only the 1904 Games in St. Louis.

Competition format

The format for the all-around competition varied widely at early Games. With individual apparatus events returning to the programme for the first time since 1904, the 1924 all-around competition returned to the aggregate scoring method. The all-around score was the sum of scores in the 7 apparatus events. This resulted in a total of 11 exercises, with both compulsory and optional exercises in the parallel bars, horizontal bar, rings, and pommel horse as well as optional exercises on the "regular" and "sidehorse" vaults and a rope climb. Scores for the four two-exercise apparati were from 0 to 11 (half-point for approach and dismount in addition to 0-10 for the exercise itself), while scores for the two types of vault and the rope climb were from 0 to 10. This led to a maximum total score of 118.

Schedule

Results

Results are listed in what appears to have been the Olympic Order of the time. Current Olympic Order (as of 2019, and as of the last few decades) is very different from what occurred in this and previous competitions. Contextual details strongly suggest that this is the order in which the gymnasts competed - High bar, Parallel bars, Rings, Rope Climb, Vault (two separate apparatus set-ups on this occasion - "Over bar" and "regular"; the "regular" was actually the sidehorse vault), and, lastly, Pommel horse.

References

External links
Official Olympic Report
 

All-round individual